Duke Ellington at the Alhambra is a live album by American pianist, composer and bandleader Duke Ellington recorded in 1958 at the Alhambra Theater, Paris and released on the Pablo label in 2002.

Reception
The Allmusic reviewer Ken Dryden stated: "Much of the music on this CD from Duke Ellington's 1958 Paris concerts is familiar to collectors from its appearance on various European bootleg labels, but Pablo does a better job arranging and annotating this music, which was recorded by Radio France with permission".

Track listing
All compositions by Duke Ellington except as indicated
 "Take the "A" Train" (Billy Strayhorn) - 3:21  
 "Medley: Black and Tan Fantasy/Creole Love Call/The Mooche" - 8:53  
 "Newport Up" (Ellington, Strayhorn) - 5:10  
 "Tenderly" (Walter Gross, Jack Lawrence) - 5:43  
 "Juniflip" - 4:19  
 "Frustration" - 4:18  
 "Rockin' in Rhythm" (Harry Carney, Ellington, Irving Mills) - 6:03  
 "Jeep's Blues" (Ellington, Johnny Hodges) - 3:31  
 "All of Me" (Gerald Marks, Seymour Simons) - 2:47  
 "Things Ain't What They Used to Be" (Mercer Ellington) - 4:07  
 "Jam With Sam" - 3:52  
 "Hi Fi Fo Fum" - 7:02  
 "Diminuendo and Crescendo in Blue" -10:41  
Recorded at the Alhambra Theatre, Paris on October 29, 1958.

Personnel
Duke Ellington – piano 
Cat Anderson, Shorty Baker, Ray Nance, Clark Terry - trumpet 
Quentin Jackson, Britt Woodman - trombone 
John Sanders - valve trombone 
Jimmy Hamilton - clarinet, tenor saxophone  
Russell Procope - alto saxophone, clarinet 
Johnny Hodges - alto saxophone 
Paul Gonsalves - tenor saxophone 
Harry Carney - baritone saxophone 
Jimmy Woode - bass 
Sam Woodyard - drums

References

2002 live albums
Duke Ellington live albums
Pablo Records live albums